DVSR (Designed Via Strength & Respect) are an Australian rap metal band from South-western Sydney, New South Wales. They were formed in November 2013, and released their debut studio album D.V.S.R. in November 2015.

History
On 24 November 2013 DVSR, then under the name Devastator, was announced and simultaneously released their music video for their single "Unconscious". The single was met with generally positive reviews, and they were noted for their unusual amalgamation of rap and djent.

In November 2015, the band announced that they were changing their name from Devastator to DVSR to coincide with their upcoming album of the same name. This was due to there already being other bands with the name Devastator, so to avoid confusion when searching online they turned the original name into an acronym; DVSR stands for "Designed Via Strength & Respect". Later that month, they released their debut self-titled album, D.V.S.R..

Members
 Current
 
 Matthew You – vocals/rapping (2013–present)
 Andrew Stevens – guitars (2013–present)
 Julian Ellul – bass (2016–present)
 Matthew Nekić – drums (2013–present)

Past 
 Adrian Tate – bass, backing vocals (2013–2016)
 Alessandro Sabato – guitars (2013-2016)

Discography

Studio albums

Extended plays

Singles

References

External links

Rappers from Sydney
Djent
Musical groups established in 2013
Rap metal musical groups
2013 establishments in Australia
Musical groups from Sydney